Lasker Rink, dedicated as the Loula D. Lasker Memorial Swimming Pool and Skating Rink was a seasonal ice skating rink and swimming pool at the southwest corner of the Harlem Meer in the northern part of Central Park in Manhattan, New York City. Designed by the architects Fordyce & Hamby Associates, it operated from 1966 to 2021. Lasker Rink was demolished after its final season of operation and is to be replaced by a new facility known as the Harlem Meer Center in 2024.

History

Early history 
In 1962, the New York Parks Department announced plans to build a swimming pool and ice skating rink at the northern part of Central Park, to cost $1.8 million. The rink would be built above the mouth of the Loch, at the southwestern corner of Harlem Meer. The facility was named for Loula Davis Lasker (1886-1961), a philanthropist and social worker, and the daughter of German immigrant Morris Davis Lasker and sister of Albert Lasker, who donated $600,000 to help build the facility. The rink was supposed to be completed in mid-1966, but flood damage caused by poor drainage prevented the pool from opening as scheduled. Lasker Rink opened on December 22, 1966. 

Lasker Rink was known to New Yorkers as being less crowded and less expensive than Wollman Rink, Central Park's other ice skating rink at the southern end of the park. Over the years, Lasker and other facilities in northern Central Park, which was surrounded by poorer neighborhoods, were generally not as well maintained as the areas in southern Central Park, which had more tourists and were generally wealthier. Several events such as a 1969 ice-skating competition were intended to draw public attention to the facility.

Trump and M&T concessions
In 1986, real estate developer Donald Trump made an offer to New York City mayor Ed Koch to rebuild at no cost the deteriorating Wollman Rink in return for a franchise to operate the rink and an adjacent restaurant to recoup his costs.  As part of the agreement to keep operating Wollman Rink, Trump agreed to also take a concession for Lasker Rink, and the Trump Organization won concessions for the rinks in 1987. The Trump Organization held the concession until 1995, when M&T Pretzel Inc. outbid Trump for a six-year contract to operate Wollman and Lasker skating rinks. 

A Trump-owned subsidiary, Wollman Rink Operations LLC, won another concession in 2001 to operate the rinks until April 30, 2021. Wollman Rink Operations LLC is owned by DJT Holdings LLC which was owned by the Donald J. Trump Revocable Trust for the duration of Trump's presidency. In 2019, the Trump Organization removed the Trump name from most signs and logos at both Wollman and Lasker Rinks without giving a reason.

On January 13, 2021, New York City mayor Bill de Blasio announced that the city government would be severing all contracts with the Trump Organization, saying Trump had been involved in the previous week's storming of the United States Capitol. The cancellation of the Trump Organization's contracts to operate Wollman Rink, Lasker Rink, and the Central Park Carousel was supposed to go into effect on February 26. The city later allowed the rinks to stay open until the scheduled end of the skating season. The Trump concession expired on April 30, 2021. Because of the rink's planned renovation (see ), NYC Parks did not select a new concessionaire at that time.

Renovations
Plans for renovating Lasker Rink dated to 2015. In November 2015, a few weeks after the start of the 2015-2016 skating season, faulty drainage forced an emergency closure of Lasker Rink; at the time, the rink was planned to remain closed for the rest of the season.  After repairs to the rink progressed at a faster rate than originally expected, it reopened two weeks after the initial closure. A $150 million project to replace Lasker Rink with a new facility was officially announced in 2018. Initial plans called for the project to be completed by 2023.

Updated plans were published in 2019, in which the rink would be closed between late 2021 and 2024. Some $150 million was to be budgeted to the project, but the renovation itself would cost $110 million, while proposed new programming would cost $40 million, The city had budgeted $50 million and the Central Park Conservancy was raising the remainder. As part of the plan, the Loch running underneath Lasker Rink would be restored to a more natural state, necessitating the demolition of the existing rink's bulky structure and surrounding paths. A boardwalk would be added along the newly restored Loch, and a new year-round facility would be built east of the site of the previous rink. The facility would be built to Leadership in Energy and Environmental Design (LEED) Gold standards and would be set within a slope, containing a new pool that would be located at a lower elevation than the previous pool. During winters, ice skaters would be allowed to skate on the boardwalk and the Loch by means of synthetic ice placed on the boardwalk. Demolition and reconstruction was scheduled to begin in early 2021, and a groundbreaking ceremony for the project began in September 2021.

Use 
The Lasker facility was used as a swimming pool in the summer and a skating/hockey rink during the winter. In the winter, Lasker Rink was open from late October through March for public skating, skating schools, and ice hockey. Over the years the ice surface had different configurations, but most recently was outfitted with two rinks, which were 195-feet by 65-feet, which is slightly smaller than the standard 200-feet by 85-feet National Hockey League hockey rinks. The rinks used artificial refrigeration to maintain the ice.

Between 2019 and its final operating season in 2021, 87% of Lasker Pool and Rink users were New York City residents. Nearly half or 45% were from the immediately surrounding neighborhoods such as Harlem, East Harlem, and Manhattan Valley, while 26% came from other Upper Manhattan neighborhoods and the Bronx, and 16% came from elsewhere in the city,

Programming 
Lasker Rink was host to an annual charity adult hockey tournament, The Central Park Classic, taking place over Presidents Day weekend, ran by the Canadian Association of New York, which drew teams from all over the northeast, including teams from Canada. Funds raised were donated to area youth hockey programs, including Ice Hockey in Harlem.

Some of the hockey programs that operated at Lasker Rink include: 
 Central Park Ice Hockey used the two rinks where adult hockey leagues played 4 on 4 ice hockey. Teams were able to be coed and were separated based on skill level.
 Ice Hockey In Harlem (IHIH), a non-for-profit that combined classroom diligence with hockey. Volunteers acted as coaches.
 The Central Park North Stars, a special needs hockey team. They played in the Special Hockey International League.
 Various private schools, such as St. David's, St. Bernard's, Buckley, and Browning hosted programs at Lasker.
 The NyIcecats, founded in 1999 by Sabbath observant Jewish families, which offered hockey to kids of every age, skill level, and religious background.

Similar setups 
Lasker Rink was the only convertible ice rink/pool facility in the United States for many years. McCarren Park Pool in Williamsburg, Brooklyn, had a similar set up in 2013 and 2014.

A similar indoor pool/rink, the Kobe Port Island Sport center, was built in Kobe, Japan, in 1981. The Osaka Pool in Osaka, Japan, also functions in this dual fashion.

References

External links 
 

Central Park
Buildings and structures completed in the 1960s